Paulo Furtado (born 9 September 1970) is a Portuguese singer-songwriter who performs under the stage name The Legendary Tigerman. Furtado started his music career in the lates 1980s when he joined the psychobilly band Tédio Boys. After leaving Tédio Boys, Furtado founded in 2000 the blues rock band Wraygunn. In 2002, he began releasing solo music under the alias The Legendary Tigerman.

The Legendary Tigerman started out as a one-man band project, where Furtado would accompany his singing with guitar, harmonica and drums alone on stage. Since 2014, Furtado also plays with a backing band. The Legendary Tigerman has released 7 studio albums to date.

Biography
Furtado was born in Portuguese Mozambique, where he lived until he was one year old. He then moved to Coimbra, Portugal with his parents. Later, he enrolled at Lisbon University to study Human Movement Science but dropped out after three days, considering the studies pointless. He then focused a lot on surfing, becoming a local body board hero.

Furtado's musical career began in the late 1980s as the lead guitarist and songwriter in the Portuguese psychobilly band Tédio Boys. The group released three albums during the 1990s and embarked on a U.S. tour. In 1999, after leaving Tédio Boys, Furtado founded the Coimbra-based blues rock outfit Wraygunn, in which he plays lead guitar and sings alongside Raquel Ralha. The band has released five albums.

During this period, Furtado began a solo career as The Legendary Tigerman. He released his first album, Naked Blues, on the Subotnick Enterprises label in 2001. While working with Subotnick Enterprises, he released the follow-up, Fuck Christmas, I Got the Blues (2003) and the remix compilation In Cold Blood (2004). Switching to Rastilho Records, he produced Masquerade in 2006, which won him critical acclaim. In 2009 he joined Jarvis Cocker on a successful tour. Following this, he switched to EMI to produce his fifth solo album, Femina, which featured collaborations with female singers and became one of the top 5 albums on the Portuguese charts.

In 2009 he released FEMINA, a record about women, with special guests such as Asia Argento, Peaches, Lisa Kekaula, Becky Lee, Phoebe Killdeer, Cibelle, Maria de Medeiros.

A year later the record went Platinum in Portugal and won Record of the Year for newspapers and magazines like Les Inrockuptibles, Rock & Folk, Telerama, El Pais, among many others.

Discography
He has released 7 albums: 
 2002: Naked Blues – Subotnick Enterprises
 2003: Fuck Christmas, I Got the Blues – Subotnick Enterprises
 2004: In Cold Blood – Subotnick Enterprises
 2006: Masquerade – Nortesul/BMG
 2009: Femina – Metrodiscos
 2014: True – Metropolitana/Sony Music Portugal
 2018: Misfit – Metropolitana/Sony Music Portugal

References

External links 

 Official website

Portuguese musicians
Portuguese male musicians
Blues musicians
Living people
Year of birth missing (living people)
Culture in Coimbra